Red Stone is a 2D massively multiplayer online role-playing game (MMORPG) developed by L&K Logic Korea.

Story 

The story of Red Stone begins in the fantasy world of Prandel as players go on an adventurous quest to search for a mystical red stone that fell from heaven. At the end of the story, the player may choose to give the red stone in exchange for rewards to one of Prandel's factions, such as the Red Devil, or the Underworld or Heaven, who seek to use the power of the Red Stone for their own gain.

Synopsis 

When the information about Red stone was first released, The game was supposed to be a single-player RPG that the player should choose one of several characters and be proceeded with the story. And then there was no news for a while, and then all of sudden, it was released as Online MMORPG game which had almost different concept from what it was at the first place. However, back in the time when it was being developed as a single-player game,  the characteristics of the game such as the transformation system were already established. The game that came out with its unique catchphrase called Transformation RPG. In fact, players were highly excited when its transformation system was released, but what came out of it was the slow-paced 2D game such as Lineage (video game). In result, many people left. However, the transformation system itself was novel and there were quite a lot strategies for it.

Gameplay 

Red stone features the combat between the player and the monster using various skills along with the transformation system. It has two classes for each character at the same time. Converting a class is called in-game term "transformation" or "weapon conversion". Classes that transform include Magician / Werewolf, Priest / Fallen Angel, Necromancer / Devil, Princess / Little witch, Maid / Demon sorceress, and Musketeer / Alchemist . The rest are weapon conversion classes.
The reason for distinguishing between transformation and weapon conversion is that the class conversion method is different. It is necessary for both transformation and weapon conversion to learn one or more of the skill of the job to be replaced, but in the case of transformation, the cost of converting the class requires 15 CP. Also, if the CP becomes negative during transformation, the transformation is cancelled.

Nintendo DS adaptation 

 is a singleplayer only adaptation for the Nintendo DS released only in Japan. It features exclusive dungeons not available in the original game.

External links 
 Official Red Stone (Global) website
 Official Red Stone (Korea) website

Massively multiplayer online role-playing games
2004 video games
Video games developed in South Korea
Windows games
Windows-only games